Héctor Humberto Gutiérrez de la Garza (born 2 November 1962) is a Mexican politician affiliated with the PRI. He currently serves as Deputy of the LXII Legislature of the Mexican Congress representing Nuevo León. He also served as Deputy during the LIX Legislature

References

1962 births
Living people
Politicians from Monterrey
Institutional Revolutionary Party politicians
21st-century Mexican politicians
Deputies of the LXII Legislature of Mexico
Members of the Chamber of Deputies (Mexico) for Nuevo León